René Lohse, married Sachtler-Lohse (born 23 September 1973) is a German former competitive ice dancer. With partner Kati Winkler, he is the 2004 World bronze medalist and a six-time German national champion. They competed at two Winter Olympics, in 1998 and 2002.

Personal life 
René Lohse was born in East Berlin to Michael and Alrun Lohse. He has one brother, Rico, and one sister, Romy. Lohse studied physical education at Humboldt University in Berlin. His profession is Sport- and Tourist manager. He is married to former figure skater Anne Sachtler. His son, Linus Gabriel, was born in May 2011.

Career 
Lohse started skating at the age of four in East Berlin after being selected for the sport in kindergarten. At first he was a single skater and was coached by Romy Kermer. In 1983, he changed coaches to Jürgen Bertko. 

At the age of 12, he left skating for other sports but two years later Kati Winkler asked him to take up ice dancing with her. They were the first East German ice dancers in years, the discipline having disappeared over the previous 18 years. Until 1996 they were coached by Knut Schubert whose expertise was more in pair skating. In 1996 they moved to Oberstdorf in Bavaria and changed their coach to Martin Skotnicky. However Winkler/Lohse always skated for the club SC Berlin (earlier SC Dynamo Berlin). They were both sergeants in the German Army's sports division, which sponsored their skating. 

In 2000-01, Winkler and Lohse became the first German ice dance team to qualify for the Grand Prix Final, where they finished fifth. They missed most of the 2001-02 season after Lohse fell in practice at the 2001 Sparkassen Cup, injuring the meniscus and ligaments in his knee. They returned in time for the Olympics where they finished 8th. In the summer of 2002, Lohse collided with a truck while he was riding his bike in Oberstdorf, "I went over the handlebars and fell on my shoulder. The bone was sticking up straight through my shoulder where I cut three ligaments." He recovered in time for them to compete in a pair of Grand Prix events and qualify for the Grand Prix Final. However, they were unable to compete in the Final because Winkler had influenza and Lohse a muscle injury in his leg. 

They missed the 2003 World Championships due to injury and also the 2004 European Championships after Lohse reinjured his knee ligaments a few days prior to the event. They recovered in time for the 2004 World Championships where they won the bronze medal. This was the greatest German success in ice dancing since 1973, the time of Angelika Buck/Erich Buck. They retired from competition after the event.

Winkler and Lohse skated in ice shows following the end of their competitive career. Lohse coaches in Berlin and has joined the German Army, which sponsors skating.

Programs 
(With Winkler)

Results 
(ice dance with Kati Winkler)

References

External links 

 
 Homepage
 Care to Ice Dance? - Winkler & Lohse

1973 births
Living people
German male ice dancers
Figure skaters at the 1998 Winter Olympics
Figure skaters at the 2002 Winter Olympics
Olympic figure skaters of Germany
World Figure Skating Championships medalists
Figure skaters from Berlin